Roberto Vestrini (30 January 1908 – 12 March 1966) was an Italian rower who competed in the 1928 Summer Olympics and in the 1932 Summer Olympics.

He won the silver medal as member of the Italian boat in the men's eight competition. Two brothers, Pier Luigi Vestrini and Renzo Vestrini, were also Olympic rowers.

References

External links
 

1908 births
1966 deaths
Sportspeople from Livorno
Italian male rowers
Olympic rowers of Italy
Rowers at the 1932 Summer Olympics
Olympic silver medalists for Italy
Olympic medalists in rowing
Medalists at the 1932 Summer Olympics
European Rowing Championships medalists